John Michael Richardson (born April 8, 1960) is a retired four-star admiral in the United States Navy who previously served as the 31st Chief of Naval Operations. He served as the Director of the Naval Nuclear Propulsion Program from November 2, 2012 to August 14, 2015. While serving as Director of Naval Nuclear Propulsion (itself a joint Department of Energy and Department of Navy organization), Richardson was responsible for the command and safe, reliable operation of the United States Navy's nuclear propulsion program and for all the current United States naval reactors deployed for usage as well as all facilities needed to ensure safe operations.  On May 13, 2015, United States Secretary of Defense, Ashton Carter, announced Richardson's nomination to succeed Admiral Jonathan Greenert as Chief of Naval Operations.
Richardson served as the 31st Chief of Naval Operations from September 18, 2015 to August 22, 2019. On October 25, 2019, Boeing announced that Richardson had been elected to its board of directors as a member of the Aerospace Safety Committee and the Special Programs Committee. In November 2019, Richardson was named as a Senior Fellow at the Johns Hopkins Applied Physics Laboratory.

Early life and education
Born on April 8, 1960 in Petersburg, Virginia, Richardson was commissioned into the United States Navy upon his graduation from the United States Naval Academy Annapolis, Maryland in 1982.

Naval career

Prior to being Director of Nuclear Propulsion, Richardson was Commander, Naval Submarine Forces (COMSUBFOR), where he was relieved by Michael J. Connor. Richardson has also commanded , Submarine Development Squadron 12, Submarine Group 8, and Submarine Allied Naval Forces South. Richardson served as the Chief of Staff for U.S. Naval Forces Europe as well as U.S. Naval Forces Africa, Naval Aide to the President of the United States and Director of Strategy and Policy at U.S. Joint Forces Command. Richardson also attended and received master's degrees from the Massachusetts Institute of Technology, the Woods Hole Oceanographic Institution, and the National War College.

Chief of Naval Operations 

On May 13, 2015, Richardson was nominated by President Barack Obama to be the Chief of Naval Operations (CNO), was confirmed August 5, and began serving as CNO on September 18, 2015. In this capacity, Richardson made several trips to China, in an effort to reduce tension between the United States and Chinese military over naval operations conducted by both countries in the South China Sea. On 22 August 2019, Richardson was succeeded by Admiral Michael M. Gilday as the 32nd Chief of Naval Operations.

Awards and decorations
In 2001, Richardson received the Vice Admiral James Bond Stockdale Award for Inspirational Leadership.

References

External links

1960 births
Chiefs of Naval Operations
Living people
National War College alumni
Recipients of the Defense Superior Service Medal
Recipients of the Navy Distinguished Service Medal
Recipients of the Legion of Merit
Recipients of the Order of Naval Merit (Brazil)
Recipients of the Vice Admiral James Bond Stockdale Award for Inspirational Leadership
United States Naval Academy alumni
United States Navy admirals
United States submarine commanders
Recipients of the Defense Distinguished Service Medal